Banja can refer to:

 Banja (woreda), an administrative division of the Amhara Region, Ethiopia
 Banja, Aranđelovac, a village in Šumadija District, Serbia
 Banja (Priboj), a village in Zlatibor District, Serbia
 , a village near Vrgorac, Croatia
 Banja, Dubrovnik-Neretva County, a village near Ploče, Croatia
 Banja, North Macedonia, a village in Češinovo-Obleševo Municipality, North Macedonia
 Banja (Fojnica), a village in Bosnia and Herzegovina
 Banja, Mališevo, a village in Kosovo
 Banja Monastery, Serbia

See also
 Various toponyms named Banja meaning spa, see 
 Banja Luka, the second largest city in Bosnia and Herzegovina
 Banjar (disambiguation)